Vaishnavi may refer to:

Vaishnavi (Matrika goddess), Hindu deity
Vaishno Devi, Hindu deity and shrine in Jammu and Kashmir
An epithet of Lakshmi, the goddess of prosperity
Vaishnavi (Tamil actress) (1986–2006), Indian Tamil television actress
Vaishnavi (Malayali actress) (active 1988-1997), Indian film actress in Tamil and Malayalam movies
Vaishnavi Dhanraj, Indian Hindi television actress
Vaishnavi Mahant, Indian Hindi television/film actress
Vaishnavi (Sinhala film), a 2018 Sinhala language film

See also
 Shri Mata Vaishno Devi University situated near the Shrine of the Mata Vaishno Devi, in Jammu and Kashmir
 Vaishnavi Institute of Technology

nn:Vaishnavi